Dwight Loomis (July 27, 1821 – September 17, 1903) was an American judge and politician from Connecticut who served as a Republican member of the U.S. House of Representatives for Connecticut's 1st congressional district from 1859 to 1863.  He served as a judge of the Superior Court of Connecticut from 1864 to 1875 and as a justice of the Connecticut Supreme Court from 1875 to 1891.

Early life and education
He was born in Columbia, Connecticut, where he attended the common schools. He also attended the academies in Monson, Massachusetts, and Amherst, Massachusetts.  In 1844, he began the study of law under John H. Brockway in Ellington, Connecticut.  He entered school in the law department of Yale University and graduated in 1847. He was admitted to the bar the same year and commenced practice at Rockville, Connecticut.

Career
Loomis served as a Whig member of the Connecticut House of Representatives in 1851.  He switched to the Republican party after the dissolution of the Whig party and served as a delegate to the Republican National Convention in 1856. In addition, he was a member of the Connecticut Senate from 1857 to 1859.

He was elected as a Republican to the Thirty-sixth and Thirty-seventh Congresses (March 4, 1859 – March 3, 1863). While in Congress, he served as chairman, Committee on Expenditures in the Department of the Treasury (Thirty-sixth Congress). He was not a candidate for renomination in 1862.

After Congress, he served as judge of the Superior Court of Connecticut from 1864 to 1875 and a justice of the Connecticut Supreme Court from 1875 to 1891. He moved to Hartford, Connecticut, in 1892 and the general assembly elected him as State Referee in important cases. He taught classes at Yale University and the school conferred an LL.D. degree in 1896.

He died on September 17, 1903, in a train accident near Waterbury, Connecticut, and was interred in Grove Hill Cemetery in Rockville, Connecticut.

Footnotes

References

Loomis, Dwight and J. Gilbert Calhoun, eds. The judicial and civil history of Connecticut. Boston: The Boston History Company, 1895.

|-

|-

1821 births
1903 deaths
19th-century American judges
19th-century American politicians
Accidental deaths in Connecticut
Burials in Connecticut
Connecticut lawyers
Connecticut state senators
Justices of the Connecticut Supreme Court
Connecticut Whigs
Members of the Connecticut House of Representatives
People from Rockville, Connecticut
Railway accident deaths in the United States
Republican Party members of the United States House of Representatives from Connecticut
Yale Law School alumni